Plectomerus is a monotypic genus of freshwater mussels in the family Unionidae, the river mussels. The sole species in the genus is Plectomerus dombeyanus. Its common name is bankclimber, as it can be found buried in steep slopes a considerable distance from water.

Distribution
This species is native to the Southeastern United States, from Texas to Florida, ranging as far north as Illinois.

Description
This mussel is not sexually dimorphic; the sexes appear the same. The shell is greenish brown to brown, darkening to black with age, and its nacre is usually deep purple.

References

Monotypic mollusc genera
Unionidae